The Waldorf Astoria Atlanta Buckhead is a 580 ft (177 m) tall combination hotel/condominium building skyscraper in Atlanta, Georgia. It was constructed from 2006 to 2008 and has 42 floors. It is the 12th tallest building in Atlanta and the fifteenth tallest residential highrise in the United States. The design architect for the building was Robert A.M. Stern Architects with Atlanta firm Milton Pate Architects serving as the Architect of Record.  The project was developed by Atlanta-based City Centre Properties, LLC and constructed by Holder Construction Company.

History
The tower was built at a cost of $197.4 million. The hotel portion opened for business on May 1, 2008 as The Mansion on Peachtree - A Rosewood Hotel & Residence, managed by Rosewood Hotels & Resorts. The grand opening was held a week later, on May 7. The hotel was sold in foreclosure to iStar Financial on February 3, 2010 for $66.1 million. It was renamed Mandarin Oriental, Atlanta in 2012. The hotel was sold to Xenia Hotels & Resorts, Inc. for $53.5 million on December 10, 2018 and renamed Waldorf Astoria Atlanta Buckhead.

Building
A 127-room hotel occupies the lower half of the building. Above the hotel are 45 residential units on 26 floors. The Residences also consist of a separate building located in the English Gardens called "The Villas". The Villas consist of three separate private residences that include three floors of living space and private underground garages.

Restaurants
In December 2008, Craft Atlanta, a branch of Tom Colicchio's New York based restaurant, opened in a freestanding building in front of The Mansion. The interiors were designed by Bentel & Bentel Architects of New York.  Milton Pate Architects of Atlanta again served as the Architect of Record for the interior build-out. Freese Construction Company of Atlanta served as the general contractor for the build out. The restaurant closed shortly before Valentine's Day 2010. Del Frisco's Grille opened in the space in late 2012. The restaurant is not part of the hotel business.

See also
List of tallest buildings in Atlanta
Hotels in Atlanta

References

External links
Waldorf Astoria Atlanta Buckhead website
Emporis
Skyscraperpage
Holder Construction Company

Residential skyscrapers in Atlanta
Residential buildings completed in 2008
Residential condominiums in the United States
Condo hotels in the United States
Skyscraper hotels in Atlanta
Robert A. M. Stern buildings
New Classical architecture
Hotels established in 2008
Hotel buildings completed in 2008